= Girbau =

Girbau Group
- Company type: Private
- Industry: Laundry Equipment
- Founded: 1960
- Headquarters: Vic (Barcelona), Spain
- Area served: Worldwide
- Products: washing machines, dryers, ironers, folders and auxiliary machinery for laundries
- Divisions: Commercial laundry division, Vended laundry division, Industrial laundry division
- Website: www.girbau.com

The Girbau Group is a company that manufactures equipment for laundries. With its headquarters in Vic (Barcelona-Spain), there are four production centres: two in Vic for the commercial division and vended (self-service) division, specialising in the manufacture of equipment for small and medium-sized laundries, and a third one in Vic and another in Aix-les-Bains (France) for the industrial division, corresponding to laundries with higher production requirements. In addition to its own production centres, it has subsidiaries in some fifteen countries plus a network of dealers in over 80 countries around the world.

== History ==
The origins of the Girbau company go back to the mid-1920s with a small electromechanical workshop devoted to manufacturing and repairing all kinds of appliances, including domestic washing machines. In the nineteen sixties, at the height of the tourist boom in Spain, the company gradually shifted its production to the manufacture of industrial machinery for laundries, providing equipment for the hotel and restaurant sector along with an after-sales service.

In 1989 Girbau began its process of internationalisation with its entry into France. Since then Girbau has continued its international expansion progressively, with a presence in other countries and continents in the form of subsidiary companies and branch offices.

== Internationalisation: timeline ==
1989 France
1992 Cuba
1995 USA
1996 The United Kingdom
1997 Brazil
1999 Argentina
2000 The United Arab Emirates
2003 Germany
2004 China
2010 Italy
2011 Australia
2011 The Dominican Republic
2012 Portugal
2015 Cancún
Headquarters: Girbau, SA – Ctra de Manlleu, km1 – 08500 Vic (Barcelona)
